Rhys Morgan (born 3 November 1978) is a New Zealand cricketer. He played in three first-class matches for Wellington in 2000/01.

He is currently the coach of the Canterbury Magicians.

See also
 List of Wellington representative cricketers

References

External links
 

1978 births
Living people
New Zealand cricketers
Wellington cricketers
Cricketers from Wellington City